Edward Breen may refer to:

 Edward G. Breen (1908–1991), American politician
 Edward D. Breen (born c. 1956), American business executive